Farahnaz Pahlavi (born 12 March 1963) is the eldest daughter of Mohammad Reza Pahlavi by his third wife, Farah Diba.

Education

She studied at the Niavaran Special School in Tehran, the Ethel Walker School in Simsbury, Connecticut, United States, and the Cairo American College in Cairo, Egypt. From 1981 to 1982, she attended Bennington College in Bennington, Vermont. She received a Bachelor of Arts in social work from Columbia University in 1986 and a Master's degree in child psychology from the same university in 1990.

According to a 2004 article in Los Angeles Times, she reportedly attempted to find employment at international aid agencies such as UNICEF, but, according to her mother, was rejected because of her name.

Ancestry

References

Bruges, Jean-Jacques de, "Shahbanou Farah", Point de Vue, 31 August-6 September 2005, Issue 2980
"Shah's Daughter Could Not Stand Exile," BBC News, 12 June 2001 
"Victory of Light Over Darkness is Near in Iran", Iran Press Service, 27 July 2001  
Bahrampour, Tara, "Singer Revives Memories of Lost Youth and Lost Country", The New York Times, 28 August 2000
Krebs, Albin and Robert McG. Thomas, "Notes on People: Pahlevis [sic] Inquire About New England School", The New York Times, 16 November 1981, page B5
Krebs, Albin and Robert McG. Thomas, "Notes on People: A Daughter of Shah Auditing College Classes", The New York Times, 28 November 1981, page 39
"Princesse Farahnaz: Les 20 Ans", Point de Vue, March 1983
Marcisz, Christopher, "Son of Shah Advocates Democracy for Iran", Berkshire Eagle, 21 April 2004
Cunningham, Bill, "Spring Sightings", The New York Times, 28 March 2004, page 9
Beaumont, Peter, "Water Resource Development in Iran", The Geographical Journal, Vol. 140, No. 3 (October 1974), pages 418-431

External links

Pahlavi princesses
1963 births
Living people
Iranian royalty
Mohammad Reza Pahlavi
Mazandarani people
Iranian emigrants to the United States
Exiles of the Iranian Revolution in the United States
Exiles of the Iranian Revolution in Egypt
Exiles of the Iranian Revolution in Morocco
Exiles of the Iranian Revolution in Panama
Exiles of the Iranian Revolution in Mexico
Exiles of the Iranian Revolution in the Bahamas
Columbia University alumni